The Cabinet of the State of Tennessee is an advisory body that oversees the executive branch of Tennessee state government. Members, titled "commissioners" are appointed by the governor--not subject to the approval of the General Assembly--and oversee various government departments and agencies. Each works with the governor to implement his policy goals within their area of expertise. Departments, and therefore commissioners, are often rearranged by newly elected governors. Additionally, several members of the governor's staff often participate in Cabinet meetings and discussions.

Current Cabinet 
Under incumbent Governor Bill Lee, there are 29 members of the Governor's Cabinet: 22 commissioners, the Director of TennCare, and 6 members of the Governor's staff.

References 

United States state cabinets
State governments of the United States
Government of Tennessee
Cabinet